The Bullard Machine Tool Company was a large American machine tool builder. It specialized in vertical boring mills and was largely responsible for the development of the modern form of that class of machine tools.

The firm was founded in 1894 by Edward Payson Bullard Sr. (born April 18, 1841 in Uxbridge, Massachusetts, USA; died December 22, 1906 in Bridgeport, Connecticut, USA). He received formative experience at the Colt armory and Pratt & Whitney, which were influential development centers for generations of toolmakers.  Bullard Sr is believed to have developed the first small boring machine designed to do the accurate work previously performed on the faceplate of a lathe. Roe (1916) says that "Up to that time boring machines were relied on only for large and rough work."

Bullard Sr.'s son, Edward Payson Bullard Jr. (1872–1953), continued the family machine tool business and brought the turret principle to the vertical boring mill, making it a vertical turret lathe. For a while in America during the 20th century, the name "Bullard" on the shop floor was something of a genericized trademark for vertical turret-head boring mills. E.P. Bullard Jr led the development of the company's multiple-spindle  brand machine that became an important automatic lathe in the mass production of parts for the automotive industry. Bullard Jr was president of the company for 40 years, through World War I, the interwar period, and World War II, a period during which the Bullard company was the largest machine tool builder in the U.S., and vast volumes of military matériel were produced by countless companies running Bullard machines. Bullard is now owned by Bourn & Koch, based in Rockford, Illinois. Bourn & Koch continues to provide OEM parts, service and support for their machines.

References

Bibliography
 .
 
 
 

Machine tool builders
People from Uxbridge, Massachusetts
1841 births
1906 deaths